Enrique "Quique" Questell Alvarado (born March 26, 1955) is a Puerto Rican politician and the former mayor of Santa Isabel. Questell is affiliated with the New Progressive Party (PNP) and served as mayor from 2005 until 2020. Has a Associate Degree in Civil Engineering from the Ponce Institute of Technology.

Tenure 
In 2016 the Puerto Rico Department of Natural and Environmental Resources filed a lawsuit against the mayor for constructing docks without permits. In the aftermath of Hurricane María a private company without a contract sued the municipality arguing it assisted with aid but this case was dismissed. During his term the mayor closed off access to the town docks due to safety concerns a move the municipal legislature later opposed.

References

1955 births
Living people
Mayors of places in Puerto Rico
New Progressive Party (Puerto Rico) politicians
People from Santa Isabel, Puerto Rico